Zemra is a DDoS Bot which was first discovered in underground forums in May 2012.

Zemra is capable of HTTP and SYN Flood flooding and also has a simple Command & Control panel that is protected with 256-bit DES encryption for communicating with its command and control (C&C) server. Zemra also sends information such as Computer name, Language settings, and Windows version. It will send this data to a remote location on a specific date and time. It also opens a backdoor on TCP port 7710 to receive commands from a remote command-and-control server, and it is able to monitor devices, collect system information, execute files, and even update or uninstall itself if necessary.

See also

References

Botnets
Denial-of-service attacks